Selva Rasalingam is a British actor. He has appeared on stage in London's West End and for the Royal Shakespeare Company. He has made many appearances in UK television series including Doctor Who, Luther and Hustle, and on film including Damascus Cover, Prince of Persia: The Sands of Time and Skyfall in which he was a member of the stunts cast. He played the role of Jesus in the 2014 version of The Gospel of John.

Life 
Selva Rasalingam was born in Tottenham in North London to a Tamil father and English mother. He trained at the Guildhall School of Music and Drama (1988–91), London.

Career 
Rasalingam portrayed Jesus in The Gospel of John and the other three Gospels produced by the Lumo Project, which was well-received as dramatisation and academically for its Biblically accurate depiction. He studied diverse historical and academic sources in preparation for the role, and filming spanned five years.

His other stage appearances include An Adventure by Vinay Patel (The Bush Theatre) Guantanamo: Honor Bound to Defend Freedom in the West End, the award-winning The Riots (Tricycle Theatre), and Amir in Pulitzer-Prize winning play Disgraced (The English Theatre Frankfurt).

Performances

Filmography 
The Way of the Wind (2022 film), as Jeroboam
Damascus Cover (2018 film), as Sabri
The Intent 2: The Come Up (2018 film), as Mehmet
Profile (2018 film), as Nabil
The Mummy (2017 film), as King Menehptre
The Gospel of Matthew (2016 film), as Jesus
The Gospel of Mark (2016 film), as Jesus
The Gospel of Luke (2016 film), as Jesus
Risen (2016 film), as James
The Gospel of John (2014 film), as Jesus
Skyfall (2012 film), as Silva's Mercenary
The Veteran (2011 film),  as Fawwaz
The Devil's Double (2011 film),  as Rokan
Prince of Persia: The Sands of Time (2010 film), as Persian Captain
Man About Dog (2005 film),  as Sheik Aga Fayed
I Am Slave TV drama 2004, as Amir

Television 
Doc Martin (2022 TV series) Buffalo Pictures / ITV as Professor Naveen Shukla
Tikkoun (2022 TV series) Curiosa Films / Canal+ as The American
Cœurs Noirs (2022 TV series) France Télévisions / Mandarin Télévision / Prime Video as Major Hadar
Ten Percent (2022 TV series) (2022 Amazon Prime Video) as Mark
The Good Karma Hospital (2022 ITV) as Amit
Honour (2020 ITV) as Ari Mahmod
Cursed (2020 Netflix) as Dizier
Doctors (2019 BBC) as Dave Masters
Versailles (2018 BBC / Canal+), as Barek
Eastenders (2018 BBC), as Umar Kazemi
Strike Back: Retribution (2018 Left Bank Pictures / Cinemax / Sky), as General Farid
Silent Witness - series 21 (2018 BBC), as Asst. Commissioner Khan
The Missing - series II (2016 BBC), as Azad
Luther - series III (2013 BBC), as Craig Lane
Run (2012 Acme Films for Channel 4), as Rakesh
Doctor Who (2012 BBC), as Ranjit
Hustle (TV series) VII, final episode (2012 Kudos Film and Television / BBC), as Barir
The Borgias (2011 TV series), (Showtime / Sky Atlantic), as Tommaso Carracci
Londyńczycy (2008 TVP1),  as Zayed Rampal
Waking the Dead, (2008 BBC), as Rashid
Spooks, (2007 Kudos Film and Television / BBC), as Ranjit

Theatre 
An Adventure, Bush Theatre, 2018, as Older Rasik
The Captive Queen, Sam Wanamaker Playhouse / Shakespeare's Globe, 2018, as Soleyman
Disgraced, The English Theatre Frankfurt, 2016, as Amir
The Nightmares of Carlos Fuentes, Arcola Theatre, 2014, as Kevin/Khaled
The Riots, Tricycle Theatre, 2012, as Mohammed Hammoudan
On the Record, Arcola Theatre, 2011, as Lasantha Wickrematunge
Guantanamo: Honor Bound to Defend Freedom, Ambassadors Theatre, 2004, as Moazzam Begg
Midnight's Children, Royal Shakespeare Company, 2003, as Shiva

Radio 
Fall of the Shah, BBC Radio Drama, 2019, as Ayatollah Khomeini
The Bethlehem Murders, BBC Radio 4 Drama, 2018, as Jihad Awdeh
Tommies: 11 November 1917 (S8E2), BBC Radio 4 Drama, 2017, as Ibrahim Habachi
Tommies: 10 November 1917 (S8E1), BBC Radio 4 Drama, 2017, as Ibrahim Habachi
Midnight's Children, BBC Radio 4 Drama, 2017, as Zagallo / Brigadier Iskander
Tommies: 2 December 1916 (S5E4), BBC Radio 4 Drama, 2016, as Hassan Chaoush

Other 
Watch Dogs: Legion, Ubisoft, 2020, Actor (voice)

References

External links

Selva Rasalingam on The Spotlight
Selva Rasalingam voice website
Voice agent's website

Living people
English people of Tamil descent
People from Tottenham
Alumni of the Guildhall School of Music and Drama
1968 births